Kitojo Hospital, is a hospital in Uganda.

Overview
Kitojo Hospital is a rural hospital, serving Ruteete, Kasenda and Buheesi subcounties and Kiko town council of Western Uganda. The hospital was built, is owned and administered by Kitojo Integrated Development Association (KIDA), a community development NGO, headed by Reverend Ezra Musobozi. The 30-bed hospital cost approximately US$310,000 (775 M UGX) to build and equip.

See also
Hospitals in Uganda

References

External links
  Location of Kitojo Hospital At Google Maps
  Kabarole District Information Portal

Hospital buildings completed in 2011
Kitojo
Kabarole District
Hospitals established in 2011